Borden Deal ( – ) was an American novelist and short story writer.

Biography
Born Loysé Youth Deal in Pontotoc, Mississippi, Deal attended Macedonia Consolidated High School, after which he joined the Civilian Conservation Corps and fought forest fires in the Pacific Northwest. Before he began writing, he worked on a showboat, hauled sawdust for a lumber mill, harvested wheat, was an auditor for the United States Department of Labor, a telephone solicitor, copywriter, and an anti-aircraft fire control instructor in Fort Lauderdale, Florida.

In 1946, Deal enrolled in the University of Alabama in Tuscaloosa. While there he published his first short story, "Exodus".  His creative writing professor was Hudson Strode. He received his Bachelor of Arts degree within three years, then enrolled in Mexico City College for graduate study.

It was not until 1956 that Deal decided to become a full-time writer. Among the pseudonyms he used were  Loyse Deal, Lee Borden, Leigh Borden, and Michael Sunga.

A prolific writer, Deal penned twenty-one novels and more than one hundred short stories, many of which appeared in McCall's, Collier's, Saturday Review, and Good Housekeeping.  His work has been translated into twenty different languages.  A major theme in his canon is man's mystical attachment to the earth and his quest for land, inspired by his family's loss of their property during the Great Depression.  The majority of his work is set in the small hamlets of the Deep South. His novel The Insolent Breed served as the basis for the Broadway musical A Joyful Noise.  His novel Dunbar's Cove was the basis for the plot of the film Wild River, starring Lee Remick and Montgomery Clift. From 1970 Deal also published, under the name "Anonymous", a series of erotic novels with pronoun titles such as Her and Him. However, after death, he is mostly remembered for his short story Antaeus.

Personal life
Deal was married three times. He married his first wife, Lilian Slobotsky (variously Slobotzky), while studying in Mexico in 1949. According to one source, the couple had one daughter before the marriage ended in divorce.  In 1952 he married his second wife, Babs Hodges (1929–2004), who was also a published author. They had one son and two daughters before divorcing in 1975. He was survived by his third wife, Patricia, whom he married in 1984.

Death
Deal died of a heart attack in Sarasota, Florida on January 22, 1985, aged 62.

Legacy
The papers of Borden and Babs Hodges Deal are held at Boston University.

Bibliography

 Walk Through the Valley, 1956
 Dunbar's Cove, 1957
 Search for Surrender, 1957
 Killer in the Mansion, 1957
 Secret of Sylvia, 1958 (as Lee Borden)
 The Insolent Breed, 1959
 Dragon's Wine, 1960
 The Devil's Whisper, 1961 (as Lee Borden)
 The Spangled Road, 1962
 Antaeus, 1962
 The Loser (New South Saga #1), 1964 
 The Tobacco Men, 1965
 A Long Way to Go, 1965
 The Advocate (New South Saga #2), 1968
 Interstate, 1970
 A Neo-Socratic Dialogue on the Reluctant Empire, 1971
 The Winner (New South Saga #3), 1973
 The Other Room, 1974 
 Bluegrass, 1976
 Legend of the Bluegrass, 1977 (as Leigh Borden)
 Adventure, 1978
 The Taste of Watermelon, 1979
 There Were Also Strangers, 1985
 The Platinum Man, 1986

References

External links 
 The Mississippi Writers Page Biographical Note (Department of English, University of Mississippi)
 The Mississippi Writers and Musicians Project Article, including photo and portrait of the author, as well as extensive bibliographic details (Starkville High School, Starkville, Mississippi)
 The FictionMags Index; Stories, Listed by Author Bibliographical listings; Periodicals
 The Big Bajor Official Website Official website for a short film based on Borden Deal's short story, The Big Baoor, about a young gypsy woman trying to swindle a fortune from a country spinster.
 

1922 births
1985 deaths
20th-century American novelists
Civilian Conservation Corps people
Novelists from Mississippi
People from Pontotoc, Mississippi
University of Alabama alumni
American male short story writers
American male novelists
20th-century American short story writers
20th-century American male writers
Mexico City College alumni